IFA or Ifa may refer to:

Organisations

Economics
 Independent financial adviser, a type of financial services professional in the UK
 Index Fund Advisors
 Institute and Faculty of Actuaries, representing actuaries in the UK
 Institute of Actuaries, in England, Wales and Northern Ireland
 Faculty of Actuaries, in Scotland
 Institute of Financial Accountants, representing accountants in the UK
 International Fiscal Association
 International Forfaiting Association

Sports
 Intercollegiate Fencing Association
 International Fistball Association
Football
 Indian Football Association, West Bengal, India
 Indoor Football Alliance
 Intercollegiate Football Association, college football organization, 1873–1893
 Iraq Football Association
 Irish Football Association, in Northern Ireland
 Islamabad Football Association
 Israel Football Association

Other organizations
 Illinois Family Action, the lobbying arm of the Illinois Family Institute in the US
 India Foundation for the Arts, a philanthropic organization
 Indo-GDR Friendship Association, in India
 Industrieverband Fahrzeugbau, East German vehicle manufacturer
 Institute for Archaeologists, in the UK
 Institute for Astronomy, University of Hawaii group that maintains the Mauna Kea Observatory
 Institute for Astronomy (Edinburgh)
 Institute for Occupational Safety and Health of the German Social Accident Insurance, a German research institute near Bonn
 International Federation on Ageing
 International Fertilizer Industry Association, represents the global fertilizer industry
 International of Anarchist Federations, L'international des Federations Anarchistes
 Internationale Funkausstellung Berlin, a consumer electronics trade fair
 Irish Farmers' Association
 New York University Institute of Fine Arts, a graduate school of New York University

Other uses
 Ifá, a system of divination that originated in West Africa
 Inter-Island Ferry Authority, a ferry service in Alaska
 Interconnexion France-Angleterre, the HVDC Cross-Channel interconnector for the transfer of electricity between France and England
 Interest Flooding Attack, a denial-of-service attack
 Interferometer, a device to measure the interference pattern caused by differing waves
 Indirect Fluorescent Antibody, test
 Incomplete Freund's adjuvant, an antigen solution to boost the immune system
 In-Flight Abort, test in spaceflight industry
 Integrated framing assembly, a type of construction product used with Insulating concrete forms.

See also 
 Aífe, a character in Irish mythology
 Aoife, an Irish given name
 Ivar F. Andresen (1896–1940), Norwegian opera singer